Each General Assembly of the legislature of the province of Nova Scotia, Canada, consists of one or more sessions and comes to an end upon dissolution (or constitutionally by the effluxion of time — approximately five years) and an ensuing general election. Today, the unicameral legislature is made up of two elements: the lieutenant governor and a legislative assembly called the House of Assembly. The legislature was first established in 1758.

Like at the Canadian federal level, Nova Scotia uses a Westminster-style parliamentary government, in which members are elected to the House of Assembly in general elections and the leader of the party with the confidence of the Assembly (normally the party with the most seats) becomes the premier of Nova Scotia and chooses the Executive Council from amongst the party's members of the Assembly.  Government is carried out in the name of the King in Right of Nova Scotia, represented by the lieutenant governor, acting on the advice of the Executive Council (the Governor in Council).

The legislature was originally bicameral. From 1758 to 1838, it had an upper house called the Council, which also held executive functions. In 1838, the Council's executive functions were given to an Executive Council, and the upper house was renamed the Legislative Council. That house was abolished in 1928.

List of Assemblies
Data before 1984 summarized from:

Post-Confederation

Pre-Confederation

See also
 List of Nova Scotia provincial electoral districts
Nova Scotia Council

Notes

 
Politics of Nova Scotia
General Assemblies